These are the departments of the Quebec Government

Executive Council of Quebec
Secrétariat du Conseil du trésor
Ministry of Agriculture, Fisheries and Food
Ministry of Culture and Communications
Ministry of Economic Development, Innovation and Export Trade
Ministry of Education, Recreation and Sports
Ministry of Employment and Social Solidarity
Ministry of Families, Seniors and the Status of Women
Ministry of Finance
Ministry of Government Services
Ministry of Health and Social Services
Ministry of Immigration, Diversity and Inclusion
Ministry of International Relations
Ministry of Justice
Ministry of Labour
Ministry of Municipal Affairs and Regions
Ministry of Natural Resources and Wildlife
Ministry of Public Security
Ministry of Revenue
Ministry of Sustainable Development, Environment and Parks
Ministry of Tourism
Ministry of Transport

See also
Politics of Quebec
Quebec

References